Mugar may refer to:

David G. Mugar, New England businessman and philanthropist
The Mugar Memorial Library at Boston University
The Mugar family of Greater Boston
The Mugar Omni Theater at the Museum of Science, Boston
Many universities in the Boston area, including Northeastern University and Tufts University, also have a "Mugar Hall" building.
The Muger River in Ethiopia
Mugar or Muger, a cement plant in Durba, Ethiopia located near this river
Muger Cement, a football club associated with the cement plant